Kleť is a mountain in the South Bohemian Region of the Czech Republic.

Location
Kleť is the second highest mountain of the in the Bohemian Forest Foothills and the highest mountain of the Blanský les Protected Landscape Area. The peak and northern slopes are situated in the territory of Křemže, the southern slopes belong to Kájov.

Buildings
Kleť Observatory is located on the southern side of the mountain. It is the highest observatory in the country.

The oldest stone observation tower in the Czech Republic was built on Kleť in 1825. It was built by Count Josef Schwarzenberg and is in the neo-Gothic style. It used to be a trigonometric point for cartographic works.

In 1925, a timbered mountain hut was built for tourists. It is a cultural monument. It contains sundial, the highest in the Czech Republic.

References

Mountains and hills of the Czech Republic
One-thousanders of the Czech Republic
Český Krumlov District